Splitter or splitters may refer to:

Technology
 DSL filter or DSL splitter, in telecommunications
 Fiber-optic splitter
 Hybrid coil, a three windings transformer
 Power dividers and directional couplers, in RF engineering
 Siamese connection for hydrants and fire hoses
 Splitter (automotive), an aerodynamic feature in cars
 Splitter, a table saw safety device
 Y-cable, a type of cable containing three ends of which one is a common end that in turn leads to a split into the remaining two ends
 Phase splitter

Science and mathematics
 Splitter (geometry), a line segment of a triangle
 Lumpers and splitters, opposing tendencies in any discipline which has to place individual examples into rigorously defined categories

Sports
 Split-finger fastball, or splitter, a baseball throwing technique
 Mark Splitter, an American college football coach
 Tiago Splitter, a Brazilian basketball player

Other uses
 Another name for fictional superhero Arm Fall Off Boy
 TimeSplitters, a first-person shooter video game

See also
 File splitter, in computing, a media demultiplexer
 Splittermuster, a World War II-era German camouflage pattern
 Split (disambiguation)
 Splitting (disambiguation)